Yakima Hill is a neighborhood in the North End of Tacoma, Washington.  Commonly confused with the adjacent North Slope, Yakima Hill is a distinct area.  Generally, the area is defined as bordering North I Street to the south-southwest and Tacoma Avenue to the north-northeast, with another portion extending from Tacoma Avenue to the south, North Borough Road to the west, North Stadium Way to the north and northeast, and North 3rd Street to the east.

Primarily residential, Yakima Hill is at a slope and is so named because North Yakima Avenue passes through it.  The area is quiet, and fairly wealthy, with a private tennis club and the Annie Wright School.

North Tacoma, Washington
Neighborhoods in Tacoma, Washington